Saturday Night Live is an American sketch comedy series created and produced by Lorne Michaels for most of the show's run. The show has aired on NBC since 1975.

After the 1979–80 season, Michaels attempted to take a break and appoint writer Al Franken his successor. However, then-president of NBC Fred Silverman passed on Franken and gave the job to associate producer Jean Doumanian, bringing in a brand new cast and mostly new writers, and resulting in the most critically unstable season in SNL's history. Doumanian was fired and replaced with Dick Ebersol, who brought in a new cast, keeping only Eddie Murphy and Joe Piscopo. Murphy and Piscopo became breakout stars and restored the show's popularity.

During the 1983–84 season, Murphy left SNL and went on to foster a successful film career. Piscopo and several other cast members also left after the season, prompting Ebersol to rebuild the cast for the following year with already-established celebrities such as Billy Crystal and Christopher Guest. After a successful 1984–85 season, NBC denied Ebersol a more permanent retool, which led to Ebersol leaving and original producer Michaels returning for the 1985–86 season.

The early-mid-1980s

Doumanian's season
For much of the 1980–81 television year, SNL was in turmoil and many critics, including Marvin Kitman of Newsday and Tom Shales of The Washington Post, wrote the show off as a pale imitation of its former glory. Jean Doumanian took over the show for season six, hiring a completely new cast and new writers, but it was plagued by problems from the start and deemed a commercial disappointment by both critics and in the Nielsen ratings.

Departing producer Lorne Michaels had wanted to make writer and cast member Al Franken his successor. Any chance of this happening under then-NBC President Fred Silverman was gone when, in a Weekend Update segment on the May 10, 1980, broadcast, Franken delivered a harsh criticism of Silverman which deeply angered the network president.

Jean Doumanian was a talent scout for SNL in the early days and was one of the few members of the staff who remained after season five. In Fall 1980, Doumanian accepted the job as the new executive producer. NBC almost immediately cut the show's budget from $1,000,000 (about $2,649,417 in 2010 dollars) per episode to about $350,000 (about $927,296 in 2010 dollars) per episode. Further, Doumanian had only two months to discover and prepare a new cast and crew; she claims she received virtually none of the support that was promised to her by either the network or her staff.

Eddie Murphy
In September 1980, talent coordinator Neil Levy received a telephone call from 19-year-old Eddie Murphy, who had begged the producer to "give him a shot" on the show, but was rejected since "the black cast member had already been chosen." Murphy pleaded with Levy that he had several siblings banking on him getting a spot on the show. Levy finally auditioned him, and recommended him to Doumanian. Doumanian, after seeing Murphy's audition, advocated for him with the network, and Murphy was cast as a featured player.

New cast for 1980
The first episode, renamed "Saturday Night Live '80" in the opening credits, aired Nov. 15, 1980, and featured an all-new cast – Charles Rocket (groomed to be the new break-out star), Denny Dillon, Gilbert Gottfried, Gail Matthius, Joe Piscopo, and Ann Risley rounded out the new cast. Yvonne Hudson was hired as a featured player and became SNL'''s first black female cast-member. Elliott Gould had agreed to host the first episode.

The Elliott Gould episode
Contributing to the sense that season six was doomed, in the first sketch the cast shared a bed with Gould and introduced themselves – Charles Rocket proclaimed himself to be a cross between Chevy Chase and Bill Murray, and Gilbert Gottfried (prior to adopting his signature screechy, obnoxious voice) referred to himself as a cross between John Belushi "and that guy from last year who did Rod Serling, and no one can remember his name" (referring to Harry Shearer).

At the end of the show, Gould stood on stage and quickly introduced himself to the cast one more time by first name and declared "We're gonna be around forever, so we might as well..."

Murphy emerges
The Malcolm McDowell episode was notable in that Eddie Murphy made his non-speaking network television debut in a sketch called "In Search of the Negro Republican". Pushing for a larger role in the show, Murphy delivered a successful "Weekend Update" commentary in the following episode (hosted by Ellen Burstyn) and garnered more appearances in subsequent episodes. He was made a full cast member by episode seven.

"Who Shot C.R.?"
On February 21, 1981 the show featured a parody of the "Who Shot J.R.?" craze from the soap opera Dallas. In a cliffhanger titled "Who Shot C.R.?", cast member Charles Rocket was "shot" in the last sketch of the episode, after a running gag in which other members of the cast shared their grievances about Rocket with one another. Onstage for the goodnights, Dallas star and that week's host Charlene Tilton asked Rocket (still in character and sitting in a wheelchair) his thoughts on being shot. "Oh man, it's the first time I've been shot in my life", he replied. "I'd like to know who the fuck did it." The cast, along with some of the audience, reacted with laughter and applause, but inside the control room, there was no laughter. Then-NBC censor Bill Clotworthy buried his head in his hands and director Dave Wilson, knowing that the show was finished for good, simply threw his script papers in the air and said "Well, that's the end of live television". and walked out of the room. According to talent coordinator Neil Levy, Doumanian herself was so livid by the incident that she was ready to jump up to the monitors and tear the video cables in half with her teeth. Rocket later unsuccessfully tried to justify his actions that the episode's musical guest Prince blurted out the word during a performance of his song "Party Up", but he ended up saying it so incoherently that the censors could not spot it. As a semi-joke, on the following week's episode hosted by Bill Murray, Murray snubbed Rocket for his behavior the previous week and told him to "watch his mouth and clean it up".

After Bill Murray hosted the following episode, the next episode scheduled for March 14, 1981, which would have been hosted by Robert Guillaume and had Ian Dury and the Blockheads as the musical guest was canceled. Subsequent reruns of the episode partially edit the good nights segment to remove the announcement for next week's episode. The cast and writers were also unaware that Brandon Tartikoff, the head of programming for NBC, invited Dick Ebersol, the original developer of SNL, to watch the show in secrecy in the control booth and was totally in despair over how the quality of the show sank.

Ebersol steps in
By 1981 SNL had been overtaken in the ratings by ABC's derivative Fridays. These factors gave the impression that NBC might cancel the show. SNL was given one more chance when Ebersol was hired to replace Doumanian. He was responsible for hiring Lorne Michaels in 1975 and now was given the task of saving the once-acclaimed show from cancellation.

In his first week, Ebersol fired Gottfried, Risley, and Rocket, replacing them with Robin Duke, Tim Kazurinsky, and Tony Rosato. At the end of the season, he would eliminate the rest of the 1980 cast except for Murphy and Piscopo. Ebersol originally wanted to bring in John Candy and Catherine O'Hara from SCTV; Candy turned down the offer and Rosato joined instead. O'Hara initially accepted the job, but changed her mind after a production meeting where Michael O'Donoghue, the original head writer for SNL and had been hired to save the show, screamed at the cast and writers for the show's poor performances and sketches. Most of them were cowering in their seats in fear, but O'Donoghue was shocked, but impressed that Murphy did not even flinch during O'Donoghue's explosive rant.

The unfinished season
Ebersol's first show aired April 11, with appearances by Chevy Chase on Weekend Update, and Al Franken asking viewers to "put SNL to sleep". Ebersol, wanting to establish a connection to the original cast, allowed Franken's mock-serious routine on the air.

Ebersol had promised Al Franken and Tom Davis that in addition to appearing on the April 11 show, they could host the next week. During the following week, with a writer's strike looming, Franken and Davis wrote material and mailed it to themselves so that their postmark could be used to prove they did not violate the strike. After seeing copies of the material, Ebersol (never a fan of Franken & Davis') caved to the writer's strike and called off the rest of the season, promising the duo they could host the season premiere that fall. As the summer ended, Ebersol, confident in his new cast, decided he no longer needed a link to the original cast. Franken claims Ebersol never returned his calls, and Franken and Davis never hosted SNL. Franken would not return to SNL until four years later, as a featured cast member.

Other episodes cancelled due to the strike were scheduled to air on April 25, 1981 (with host Dan Aykroyd, former cast member), May 9, 1981 (with host Steve Martin, an SNL favorite), May 16, 1981 (with host Brooke Shields), and May 23, 1981 (with another frequent SNL host, Buck Henry). Aykroyd wouldn't get a chance to host until the 28th season finale in 2003, Martin didn't come back until 1986, Shields has yet to host, and Henry never hosted again.

1981–82 season set-up
By fall 1981, Joe Piscopo and Eddie Murphy were the only performers from Doumanian's cast to appear on SNL for season seven. Murphy became a break-out star under Ebersol, and his soaring popularity helped restore the show's ratings. He created memorable characters, including the empty-headed former child movie star Buckwheat and an irascible, life-size version of the Gumby toy character, complete with life-size star ego. Murphy also performed an uncanny impression of Stevie Wonder (Wonder sportingly hosted in 1983 and appeared in a fake ad for the "Kannon AE-1" camera, which is "so simple, even Stevie Wonder can use it".) Piscopo was also popular, renowned for his Frank Sinatra impersonation, as well as his characters Paulie Herman and (with Robin Duke) Doug & Wendy Whiner.

Other new cast members for the 1981 season included Christine Ebersole, Mary Gross, and 1979 featured player Brian Doyle-Murray, who ran the Weekend Update (under the title Saturday Night Live Newsbreak & Current Affairs) desk for one season. Also returning were Second City veterans Robin Duke, Tim Kazurinsky, and Tony Rosato, who had debuted April 11.  Tired of recently losing key players to NBC (such as Cheers George Wendt and Hill Street Blues' Betty Thomas), the Second City top brass directed Ebersol around the corner to the Practical Theatre Company, where he hired Gary Kroeger, Brad Hall, Julia Louis-Dreyfus (who later married Hall) to join in the fall. Second City alumnus James Belushi, the late John Belushi's brother, arrived three shows into season nine due to stage commitments in Chicago.

Dick's show
Ebersol ran a very different show from Michaels had in the 1970s. Many of the sketches were built less on "smart" and "revolutionary" comedy that was abundant in the early days and followed a much more "straightforward" approach. This shift alienated some fans and even some writers and cast members. Ebersol was eager to attract the younger viewers that advertisers craved. He dictated that no sketch should run longer than five minutes, so as not to lose the attention of teenagers.

Having come from the ranks of management, Ebersol was adept at dealing with the network. Later in his tenure, he was handling much of the business aspects and day-to-day production affairs, leaving producer Bob Tischler in charge of most of the creative facets of the show.

Unlike Michaels, Ebersol had no difficulty firing people. Among the first casualties after the 1981 season were Rosato (who later said that the firing was the best thing to ever happen to him, as he felt that the show's atmosphere encouraged his drug addiction) and Ebersole, who got the axe because of her frequent complaints that the women on the show had little airtime and what they did receive cast them in sexist and humiliating light. Michael O'Donoghue was fired in December 1981, after repeated arguments with Ebersol over the creative direction of the show, and because of his abusive treatment of the cast.

Eddie Murphy
With the release of the film 48 Hours, Murphy's star began to eclipse the other cast members. Murphy's co-star in the film, Nick Nolte, was scheduled to host the show, but canceled at the last minute. Ebersol offered Murphy the chance to host, a move that Piscopo would perceive as a major slight. Piscopo would later claim that Ebersol used Murphy's success to divide the two erstwhile friends and play them against one another.

Another new cast
In February 1984, Eddie Murphy left the show. His appearances for the remainder of the season consisted of sketches he had pre-taped in September 1983. Duke, Piscopo, Hall, and Kazurinsky were not invited to return after season nine. Piscopo was offered a chance to guest host during season ten, but declined.

Upon the departures of Murphy and Piscopo, Ebersol, having lost his key players, began rebuilding the cast for season ten, enlisting what is in retrospect known as the "All-Star" cast. Along with veteran players James Belushi, Gross, Kroeger, and Louis-Dreyfus, Ebersol added, for the first time in the show's history, well-known names to the repertory. This new cast included Soap star Billy Crystal; Martin Short, who had made a name for himself as Ed Grimley (a character he would bring to SNL that year) on Canada's SCTV; Christopher Guest and Harry Shearer (who was also a cast member in 1979) from The Credibility Gap and This Is Spinal Tap;  Pamela Stephenson from Not the Nine O'Clock News and Superman III; and Rich Hall from HBO's Not Necessarily the News.

Billy Crystal became the show's break-out star. Crystal had been scheduled to appear in the first SNL in 1975, but walked when his airtime was whittled away during rehearsal. Already known for his stand-up comedy and even more for his role as Jodie Dallas on Soap, Crystal became the show's latest sensation, bringing the catch-phrases "It is better to look good than to feel good" and "You look mahvelous!" (both uttered by his "Fernando" character) into popular culture.

Harry Shearer would depart after the January 12, 1985, broadcast, citing "creative differences". Shearer would later remark "I was creative...and they were different." Shearer would go on to greater fame as a cast member of The Simpsons in which he voiced several characters including Mr. Burns and Principal Skinner.

End of the Ebersol era
At the end of the season, Ebersol requested to completely revamp the show to include mostly prerecorded segments. Short, Guest, and Hall had grown tired of the show's demanding production schedule and showed little interest in returning for another season, leaving Crystal the only "A-cast" member available for season 11. Like Michaels at the end of season five, Ebersol made it known to NBC that he would only return to SNL if the network would take the show off the air for several months to re-cast and rebuild. Another idea was to institute a permanent rotation of hosts (Billy Crystal, Joe Piscopo, and David Letterman) for "a hip Ed Sullivan Show".

After briefly canceling the show, NBC decided to continue production only if they could get Lorne Michaels to produce again. Ebersol and Tischler, along with their writing staff and most of the cast, left the show after this season (those who wished to stay, such as Billy Crystal, were eventually not re-hired for 1985), which closed the book on an inconsistent, yet memorable, era in SNL history.

Season breakdown

Season 6: 1980–1981

Cast
Denny Dillon
Robin Duke (first episode: April 11, 1981)
Gilbert Gottfried (last episode: March 7, 1981)
Tim Kazurinsky (first episode: April 11, 1981)
Gail Matthius
Eddie Murphy (first episode: November 22, 1980)
Joe Piscopo
Ann Risley (last episode: March 7, 1981)
Charles Rocket (last episode: March 7, 1981)
Tony Rosato (first episode: April 11, 1981)FeaturingYvonne Hudson (first episode: December 6, 1980/last episode: March 7, 1981)
Matthew Laurance (first episode: November 22, 1980/last episode: March 7, 1981)
Laurie Metcalf (first episode: April 11, 1981) (uncredited, but appeared)
Emily Prager (first episode: April 11, 1981) (credited, but did not appear)
Patrick Weathers (first episode: December 6, 1980/last episode: November 14, 1981)

1981–1982 season

Cast
Robin Duke
Christine Ebersole
Mary Gross
Tim Kazurinsky
Eddie Murphy
Joe Piscopo
Tony RosatoFeaturingBrian Doyle-Murray

1982–1983 season

Cast
Robin Duke
Mary Gross
Brad Hall
Tim Kazurinsky
Gary Kroeger
Julia Louis-Dreyfus
Eddie Murphy
Joe Piscopo

 Recurring characters and sketches 
Brad Hall hosted Saturday Night News throughout the season. Recurring characters featured during this season include The Whiners, Mister Robinson (host of a parody of Mister Rogers' Neighborhood''), and Buckwheat.

1983–1984 season

Cast
James Belushi (debut: October 22, 1983)
Robin Duke
Mary Gross
Brad Hall
Tim Kazurinsky
Gary Kroeger
Julia Louis-Dreyfus
Eddie Murphy (final: February 25, 1984)
Joe Piscopo

1984–1985 season

Cast
James Belushi
Billy Crystal
Mary Gross
Christopher Guest
Rich Hall
Gary Kroeger
Julia Louis-Dreyfus
Harry Shearer (final: January 12, 1985)
Martin Short
Pamela Stephenson

References

1980
Saturday Night Live in the 1980s